USS F-4 (SS-23) was a United States Navy F-class submarine. Her keel was laid down by the Moran Company of Seattle, Washington. She was originally named Skate, making her the first ship of the United States Navy named for the skate. She was renamed F-4 on 17 November 1911. She was launched on 6 January 1912 sponsored by Mrs. M.F. Backus; and commissioned on 3 May 1913.

Service history
Joining the First Submarine Group, Pacific Torpedo Flotilla, F-4 participated in the development operations of that group along the west coast, and from August 1914, in Hawaiian waters out of Naval Submarine Base Pearl Harbor. Despite valorous efforts of naval authorities at Honolulu to locate the missing boat and save her crew, all 21 perished. F-4 was the first commissioned submarine of the U.S. Navy to be lost at sea.

A diving and engineering precedent was established with the Navy's raising of the submarine on 29 August 1915. Divers descended to attach cables to tow the boat into shallow water, Naval Constructor Julius A. Furer, Rear Admiral C.B.T. Moore, and Lieutenant C. Smith were able to do this with the use of specially devised and constructed pontoons. Navy diver George D Stillson found the superstructure caved in and the hull filled with water.  One of the divers involved in the salvage operation was John Henry Turpin, who was, probably, the first African-American to qualify as a U.S. Navy Master Diver.  Only four of the dead could be identified; the 17 others were buried in Arlington National Cemetery.

The investigating board subsequently conjectured that corrosion of the lead lining of the battery tank had permitted seepage of sea water into the battery compartment and thereby caused the commanding officer to lose control on a submerged run. Others believe that the bypassing of an unreliable magnetic reducer closed a Kingston valve in the forward ballast tank resulting in a delay. Based on other reported issues, there may also have been problems with the air lines supplying the ballast tank.

F-4 was stricken from the Naval Vessel Register on 31 August 1915 and was taken from the dry dock in Honolulu Harbor in early September 1915 so the other three F-Class submarines could be dry docked as they had been rammed by the navy supply ship . The F-4 was moved, still hanging from the pontoons to Pearl Harbor and anchored in Magazine Loch until on or about 25 November 1915, when she was disconnected from the pontoons and settled into the mud at the bottom of the loch. She remained there until the expansion of the harbor in 1940, when the remains of F-4 were re-buried in a trench dug in the loch bottom off the Submarine Base Mooring S14, Pearl Harbor.

References

External links
PigBoats.COM F-Boats
Pigboats.COM F-4 Salvage

On Eternal Patrol: USS F-4
The United States Submarine F-4 at arlingtoncemtery.net

United States F-class submarines
United States submarine accidents
Lost submarines of the United States
Shipwrecks in the Pacific Ocean
Shipwrecks of Hawaii
Maritime incidents in 1915
Ships built in Seattle
1912 ships
1915 in Hawaii